Benjamin Velez is an American composer and lyricist.

Early life 

Velez was born in Miami, Florida. He is a graduate of Columbia University where he studied film and wrote the 114th annual Varsity Show.

Career 

Velez joined the BMI Lehman Engel Musical Theater Workshop in 2010, where he developed multiple projects, including Afterland, Starblasters, and Borderline. 

With book writer and co-lyricist Katie Hathaway, Velez developed Afterland at the Yale Institute for Music Theater (2014), the York Theater (2016), and as a part of several concert series in New York City, including Cutting Edge Composers and a One Night Stand at Ars Nova (2018). Starblasters had a reading at Dixon Place in 2018.

Velez wrote the score for Borderline, an original musical created with book writer Aryanna Garber, which won the 2018 Weston Playhouse New Musical Award and opened the 2019 O’Neill National Musical Theater Conference.

Velez wrote the music and co-wrote the lyrics (with David Kamp) for Kiss My Aztec, a new musical from John Leguizamo directed by Tony Taccone. It was developed at the Public Theater and premiered at Berkeley Repertory Theater and La Jolla Playhouse in 2019, where it received critical acclaim.

Awards 

 2012 BMI Foundation Harrington Award
 2017 Sundance Institute Residency at the Ucross Foundation
 2018 Weston Playhouse New Musical Award
 2018-2019 Dramatists Guild Foundation Fellow
 2019 Fred Ebb Award
 2020 Jonathan Larson Award

References

External links 

 Broadway World
 

American musical theatre composers
Columbia College (New York) alumni
Living people
Place of birth missing (living people)
Songwriters from New York (state)
1988 births